James B. Campbell is a performer, pedagogue, and author within the realm of percussion and is a respected figure in the development of the contemporary percussion ensemble. Campbell has toured extensively throughout the Americas, Europe, and Asia.

Past associations 
Campbell received both his B.M. in Music Education and his M.M. in Percussion Pedagogue and Performance from Northern Illinois University. Beginning in 1984 Campbell served as the principal instructor, arranger, and program coordinator for The Cavaliers Drum and Bugle Corps. Due to Campbell’s time with the Cavaliers he was inducted into the Drum Corps International Hall of Fame in 2008 as well as the Bands of America Hall of Fame in 2013. Campbell has also served as percussion director for the McDonald’s All-American High School Band and past president of the Percussive Arts Society. Among Campbell’s works for percussion, he has published with Hal Leonard Publishing, C.L. Barnhouse Co., C. Alan Publications, Innovative Percussion, Row-Loff Productions, Meredith Music, Alfred Publications, and Bachovich Music.

Current affiliations 
James Campbell is a clinician for the Avedis Zildjian Company, Artist for Yamaha Corporation of America, and endorsee for Innovative Percussion, Evans Drumheads, Meinl Percussion, and Black Swamp Percussion. Campbell is currently the drummer with the Kentucky Jazz Repertory Orchestra and is principal percussionist with the Lexington Philharmonic Orchestra. Campbell is also provost’s distinguished service professor of Music and Director of percussion studies at the University of Kentucky.

References 

Year of birth missing (living people)
Living people
American percussionists
Northern Illinois University alumni